Christoph Jacob Trew (16 April 1695 in Lauf an der Pegnitz – 18 July 1769) was a German botanist.

He was originally a city solicitor, court physician, Count Palatine of the Holy Roman Empire, an advisor to the Margrave of Brandenburg-Ansbach. He also had an academic passion for botany. He was a member of the Royal Society of London, the Berlin Academy, and the Florentine Botanical Society. His interest in botany then led him to sponsor the publication of illustrated botanical books.

In 1732, Christoph Jacob Trew saw some of Georg Ehret's drawings. Ehret was a botanist and illustrator, from Heidelberg, Germany. Liking them, Trew then became Ehret's patron. Ehret sent many paintings to Trew over the next few years.

Between 1750-1773 Trew began Plantae Selectae Quarum Imagines (it was published in Nuremberg). It has many illustrations by Georg Ehret. Trew wrote the plant descriptions. 

Up to 16 new names of plants were published by Trew in the series; including Cochliasanthus .

Benedict Christoph Vogel wrote them after Trew's death in 1769, to help finish the work.

Later, in 1914, botanists Pax & K.Hoffm. published Afrotrewia, which is a monotypic genus of flowering plants belonging to the family Euphorbiaceae. It was named in Christoph Jacob Trew's honour, plus the continent (of Africa) where the plant was found.

References

External links

1695 births
1769 deaths
People from Lauf an der Pegnitz
Court physicians
18th-century German botanists